Al Maqal is a district of Basra, Iraq which lies in the north of the city centre, where the Shatt Al Arab Hotel,  and Al-Maqal Port lie.

References

Port cities and towns in Iraq
Populated places in Basra Province